The 1981 CONCACAF Championship, the eighth edition of the CONCACAF Championship, was held in Honduras from 1 to 22 November. All games were played in the Estadio Tiburcio Carías Andino in Tegucigalpa. This tournament was won by the host, Honduras, who earned their first title and secured for the first time a place in the FIFA World Cup, as the tournament also served as qualification to Spain 1982. The North, Central American and Caribbean zone was allocated two places (out of 24) in the final tournament. This edition was marked by an upset as Mexico, traditional CONCACAF heavyweights and needing a win to go through, were eliminated by Honduras. The 0–0 tie between Mexico and Honduras qualified El Salvador to participate in the World Cup as the CONCACAF runners-up. El Salvador also became the first Central American team to qualify for more than one World Cup. This would be the last tournament which would feature a host nation for the final round.

Venues

Qualification

Final round

Honduras and El Salvador qualified for the 1982 FIFA World Cup.

Goalscorers

3 goals

 Hugo Sánchez

2 goals

 Ian Bridge
 Mike Stojanović
 Ramón Núñez
 David Buezo
 José Roberto Figueroa
 Ricardo Castro

1 goal

 Bob Iarusci
 Wes McLeod
 Jorge Luis Rodríguez
 Ever Hernández
 Norberto Huezo
 Daniel Cadet
 Gerald Romulas
 Anthony Costly
 Carlos Orlando Caballero
 Eduardo Laing
 Jorge Elvir Urquia
 Manuel Manzo

1 own goal
 Frantz Mathieu (playing against Cuba)

Notes
To date, this is the last time that Mexico failed to qualify for a FIFA World Cup. (Mexico did not appear in the 1990 FIFA World Cup as they were banned in light of a scandal in which they used overage players in a youth tournament.)

External links

 
Championship
1982 FIFA World Cup qualification
1981
1981
1981
football
1981–82 in Mexican football
1981–82 in Salvadoran football
1981–82 in Honduran football
1981 in Canadian soccer
November 1981 sports events in North America
Sports competitions in Tegucigalpa
20th century in Tegucigalpa